Murman may refer to:

Places
 Murman Coast, a coastal area in Murmansk Oblast, Russia
 Murman, the same as the Kola Peninsula, Russia
 Murman Sea, former name of the Barents Sea

Ships 
 Saint Andrew (ship), renamed Murman in 1910
 Icebreaker Murman, see Drifting ice station
 Murman, original name of Rautu-class minesweeper Rautu

Other 
 Murman Murmansk, a bandy club in Murmansk, Russia
 Murman Scientific Fisheries Expedition, earlier name of the Nikolai M. Knipovich Polar Research Institute of Marine Fisheries and Oceanography
 Murman Railway, the original name of the Kirov Railway connecting Saint Petersburg with Murmansk

People with the given name
Murman Dumbadze (born 1960), Georgian politician
Murman Omanidze (born 1938), Georgian politician

See also 
 Moorman (disambiguation)
 Moerman (disambiguation)
 Murmansk (disambiguation)